Dragan Milenkovič (born May 23, 1984) is a Macedonian former professional basketball Shooting guard who played for MZT Skopje and Karpoš Sokoli.

External links

References

1984 births
Macedonian men's basketball players
Living people
Macedonian people of Serbian descent
Sportspeople from Skopje
Shooting guards